is a video game developed by h.a.n.d. Inc. It was released for the Wii via Nintendo's WiiWare service.

Gameplay
In a variation on the usual Harvest Moon focus on farming and animal husbandry, this title revolved around running a shop. Players can choose either a female or male avatar who then creates a series of shops with different designs and utilizes the Wiimote for a series of minigames. The game also incorporates social aspects such as taking snap shots of the shops and posting them on the Wii message board.

Story
The protagonist has taken to running a shop in Clover Town that his grandparents used to run on their farm. The town is rundown, with businesses and people leaving en masse; the player is tasked with the town, and the towns spirits, revival. Characters from previous Harvest Moon games also make an appearance.

Development
The game was previewed at E3 2009. Four sets of add-on content were made available for the game; a Juice Bar Set, an Egg Stand Set, and Ice Cream Set, and a New Friends set between November 2009 and January 2010.

References

2009 video games
H.a.n.d. games
Single-player video games
My Little Shop
Video games developed in Japan
Video games featuring protagonists of selectable gender
Wii-only games
WiiWare games